The Commission on Administrative Justice  of Kenya also known as The Office of the Ombudsman is a government Commission established under the Commission on Administrative Justice Act 2011 pursuant to Article 59 (4) of the Constitution of Kenya.

Role
The Key functions of the Commission are:
 Quasi-judicial mandate to deal with maladministration.
 Ensuring compliance with leadership, integrity and ethics requirements.
 Litigation and quasi- judicial functions.
 Reporting Obligation.
 Training of Government Ministries Departments and agencies.
 Resolution of inter-governmental conflicts.
 Provision of advisory opinions and recommendations
 Promotion of Constitutionalism and Human Rights advocacy and;
 Performance contracting

Membership
The current membership of the Commission on Administrative Justice is as follows:
 Hon. Florence Kajuju (Chairperson)
 Washington Sati  (Vice Chairperson)
 Lucy Ndungú (Commissioner Access to Information)
 Leonard Ngaluma  (Commission Secretary)

Previous Members
 Otiende Amollo (Chairman)
 Regina Mwatha 
 Saadia Mohamed
 Leonard Ngaluma

Notable Events
On 17 December 2012 the Commission wrote a letter to the Independent Electoral and Boundaries Commission (IEBC)  stating that 36 Kenyans including 2 Members of Parliament, Gideon Mbuvi and Ferdinand Waititu were unfit to hold office and therefore ineligible participate in the upcoming General election.
Also on the list were 22 commissioners of the now defunct Electoral Commission of Kenya who were accused of mismanaging the 2007 General Election.

References

External links 
 'Official Site'

Politics of Kenya
Government agencies of Kenya
2012 in Kenya
Law of Kenya
Kenya articles by importance